The Stern family is a Jewish French banking family originally from Frankfurt. It traces back to Samuel Hayum Stern (1760–1819), who in the 1780s became a wine merchant in Frankfurt.

His son, Jacob Samuel Heyum Stern, started a banking business, named , in 1805 in Frankfurt. His sons expanded the family venture to Berlin, London and Paris, of which the latter became most prominent as Bank Stern and later as J. Stern & Co.

Family tree 

 Samuel Hayum Stern (1760–1819)
 Jacob Samuel Heyum Stern (1780–1833)
 Wolf Jacob Stern (1801–1854)
 Saly Wilhelm Stern (1832–?)
 Jacques Stern (1882–1949)
  (1805–1886), banker in Paris, founder of AJ Stern & Co. (which later became Bank Stern)
 Henriette Stern (1836–1905), married to Georges Halphen (1832–1906)
 Fernand Halphen (1872–1917), composer
 Jacques Stern (1839–1902), banker in Paris, co-founder of Banque de Paris et des Pays-Bas, married to 
 Louis Stern (1840–1900), banker in Paris, married to Ernesta de Hierschel
 Julius Jacob Stern (1807–1852), a banker in Berlin
 Julius James Stern (1835–1901)
 Albert Gerald Stern (1878–1966)
 Frederick Claude Stern (1884–1967)
  (1837–1900)
 Suzette Stern (1845–?), married to Henri Jules Fould (1837–1895)
 Marguerite Fould (1866–1956), married to her second cousin  (1854–1936)
 Leopold Stern (1810–1846), banker
 David de Stern (–1877), banker in London, co-founder of Stern Brothers, ennobled by Luís I of Portugal in 1869
 Sydney Stern (1845–1912)
 Helen Stern (1847–1933), married to Charles Warde (1845–1937)
 Edward Stern (1854–1933), London banker and philanthropist, married to: 1. Constance Jessel (1858–1918), daughter of George Jessel; 2. Sybil Grace (1887–1979), daughter of Sir Adolf Tuck
 Alice Stern (1854–1925), married to Francis Lucas
 Hermann de Stern (1815–1887), banker in London, co-founder of Stern Brothers
 Emily Theresa Stern (1846–1905), wife of Edward Dutton, 4th Baron Sherborne (1831–1919)
 Herbert Stern (1851–1919)
 Herman Alfred Stern (1900–1984), married to Beatrice Capel  (sister of Boy Capel)
 Laura Stern, married to David Lionel Goldsmid-Stern-Salomons
 Salomon Stern (1818–1890), banker
  (1854–1937), Paris banker and art collector, married to his second cousin Marguerite Fould (1866–1956)
 Suzanne Stern (1887–1954), married to 
 Maurice Stern (1888–1962), banker in Paris
 Antoine Stern (1925–1995), banker, married to Christiane Laroche (divorced from Jean-Jacques Servan-Schreiber)
 Édouard Stern (1954–2005), banker, married to Béatrice David-Weill (daughter of Michel David-Weill)
 Henri Stern
 Louis Stern
 Mathilde Stern
 Gerard Stern (1927–), married to Brigitte Noetzlin (granddaughter of )
 Jerome Stern (1969–), banker in London, founder of J. Stern & Co, married to Sarah von Goldschmidt-Rothschild (daughter of Gilbert de Goldschmidt)
 Therese Stern (1859–1935), wife of Louis Singer (son of )
 Caroline Stern (1782–1854), married Salomon Mayer von Rothschild (1774–1855)

References

External links 

French bankers
History of banking
Banking families
Jewish-German families
Fould family
Stern family (banking)